Facundo Argüello was the defending champion but lost in the first round to Frances Tiafoe.

Quentin Halys won the title, defeating Frances Tiafoe 6–7(6–8), 6–4, 6–2 in the final.

Seeds

Draw

Finals

Top half

Bottom half

References

External links
Main draw
Qualifying draw

2016 ATP Challenger Tour
2016 Singles